Keith Doyle (born 20 July 1979) is an Irish former footballer.

A full back Keith joined Shamrock Rovers from Bray Wanderers in May 2002 where he stayed until the end of the 2005 season when Rovers got relegated. He made a total of 93 appearances scoring once . These included 3 appearances in European competition during his time with the Hoops.

He started his career at Swords Celtic before moving to St Patrick's Athletic and was one of the players to win the European Under-18 Championship in 1998 under Brian Kerr.

Honours
Republic of Ireland
UEFA European Under-18 Football Championship (1): 1998

St Patrick's Athletic
League of Ireland (2): 1997-98, 1998-99
Leinster Senior Cup (1): 1999-2000

Republic of Ireland association footballers
Republic of Ireland youth international footballers
St Patrick's Athletic F.C. players
Athlone Town A.F.C. players
Bray Wanderers F.C. players
Shamrock Rovers F.C. players
University College Dublin A.F.C. players
League of Ireland players
Living people
1979 births
Association football defenders